Bayan Lake (Mongolian: rich lake) is a lake in Zavkhan Province, Mongolia.

References

Lakes of Mongolia
Zavkhan Province